Jacques Vergnes (born 21 July 1948) is a French former professional footballer who played as a striker. He made one appearance for the France national team in 1971, scoring in that one match.

External links
 Stats
 
 

1948 births
Living people
Sportspeople from Hérault
Association football forwards
French footballers
France international footballers
Ligue 1 players
Ligue 2 players
Red Star F.C. players
Nîmes Olympique players
SC Bastia players
Stade de Reims players
Stade Lavallois players
RC Strasbourg Alsace players
FC Girondins de Bordeaux players
Montpellier HSC players
Footballers from Occitania (administrative region)